Castilleja sessiliflora is a species of flowering plant in the family Orobanchaceae known by the common names downy Indian paintbrush and downy paintedcup. It is native to the Great Plains of North America from southern Canada, through the central United States, to northern Mexico. It occurs as far west as the eastern slopes of the Rocky Mountains.

Description
It is hemiparasitic, obtaining water and nutrients from other plants by tapping their roots. This Castilleja species has been observed parasitizing eastern redcedar (Juniperus virginiana) and oldfield juniper (J. communis var. depressa). It reproduces sexually and vegetatively by resprouting from its root crown.

The petals are fused and form a curvilinear tube. The sepals are shorter, with narrow lobes. Altogether, the inflorescence is green, yellowish, and pink.

This plant grows in several habitat types, including prairie, shinnery, Texas savanna, and shrubsteppe. It is pollinated by a hawk moth.

References

External links

sessiliflora
Flora of Western Canada
Flora of the Northwestern United States
Flora of the North-Central United States
Flora of the Southwestern United States
Flora of the South-Central United States
Flora of Northeastern Mexico